Ribera Baja del Ebro is a comarca in eastern Aragon, Spain. It is part of the historical region of Lower Aragon. The most important town is Quinto.

It is located by the River Ebro about 40 km south-east of Zaragoza. The traditional economy was based on the cultivation of cereals and olive trees.

This comarca has a dry, continental climate, with marked seasonal changes, the summers are hot and relatively short compared with the long cold winters. Sometimes it is subjected to floods caused by River Ebro.

See also
Rueda Abbey
Comarcas of Aragon
 Lower Aragon

References

External links 

 
Birdwatching in Monegros, Belchite steppes, Planeron, Quinto

Comarcas of Aragon
Geography of the Province of Huesca
Geography of the Province of Zaragoza